The 1946 Philadelphia Athletics season involved the A's finishing eighth in the American League with a record of 49 wins and 105 losses.

Regular season 
Buddy Rosar led the American League in assists and set the record for errorless games by a catcher, posting a 1.000 fielding percentage in 117 games.

Season standings

Record vs. opponents

Roster

Player stats

Batting

Starters by position 
Note: Pos = Position; G = Games played; AB = At bats; H = Hits; Avg. = Batting average; HR = Home runs; RBI = Runs batted in

Other batters 
Note: G = Games played; AB = At bats; H = Hits; Avg. = Batting average; HR = Home runs; RBI = Runs batted in

Pitching

Starting pitchers 
Note: G = Games pitched; IP = Innings pitched; W = Wins; L = Losses; ERA = Earned run average; SO = Strikeouts

Other pitchers 
Note: G = Games pitched; IP = Innings pitched; W = Wins; L = Losses; ERA = Earned run average; SO = Strikeouts

Relief pitchers 
Note: G = Games pitched; W = Wins; L = Losses; SV = Saves; ERA = Earned run average; SO = Strikeouts

Farm system

References

External links
1946 Philadelphia Athletics team at Baseball-Reference
1946 Philadelphia Athletics team page at baseball-almanac.com

Oakland Athletics seasons
Philadelphia Athletics season
Oak